Hetch Hetchy Dome is a granite dome, in the Hetch Hetchy area of Yosemite National Park.

On Hetch Hetchy Dome's particulars

Aside from being aside Hetch Hetchy Reservoir, Hetch Hetchy Dome is near Kolana Rock.

Hetch Hetchy Dome Dome has a few rock climbing routes.

References

External links and references

 On a nearby hiking trail
 Hiking around Hetch Hetchy
 More on hiking the area
 A topographic map of the area
 Some history, of Hetch Hetchy Valley
 One photo

Granite domes of Yosemite National Park